Eldridge Industries LLC is an American holding company headquartered in Greenwich, Connecticut, with offices in New York City, London, and Beverly Hills. Eldridge makes investments in various industries including insurance, asset management, technology, sports, media, real estate, and the consumer sector.

History 
Eldridge was formed in 2015 by CEO and Chairman Todd Boehly, President Anthony D. Minella, and General counsel Duncan Bagshaw, after Boehly purchased Dick Clark Productions, Billboard and The Hollywood Reporter, and Mediabistro from Guggenheim Partners.

Eldridge owns CBAM Partners, an SEC-registered investment advisor. In 2019, Eldridge increased its investment in Maranon Capital, an investment manager, resulting in Eldridge holding a majority ownership stake in the company.

In December 2020, Eldridge provided financing to Ark Invest, allowing ARK founder Cathie Wood to remain majority shareholder of the company.

In January 2021, the College of William & Mary announced that it had partnered with Eldridge to develop a series of courses related to fiscal policy at the Mason School of Business.

In 2021, some of Eldridge's credit management operations spun out to create Panagram Structured Asset Management. Eldridge sold CBAM Partners, an SEC-registered investment advisor, to The Carlyle Group for $787 million in 2022.

Horizon Acquisition Corporation 
Eldridge's special-purpose acquisition company Horizon Acquisition Corporation was founded in June 2020. The company filed for a blank check IPO of $575 million in August 2020. Horizon Acquisition Corporation II, an SPAC focused on media and entertainment, in August 2020. In 2022, it was announced that the SPAC would merge with Flexjet, taking the airline public with a combined value of $3.1 billion.

Horizon Acquisition Company merged with ticket reseller Vivid Seats in April 2021, taking them public as Vivid on October 19, 2021. Vivid is traded on the Nasdaq.

Sports 
In March 2017, Eldridge led a round of funding estimated at over $100 million for DraftKings, a daily fantasy sports contest provider. DraftKings purchased a stake in Vivid from Eldridge, when the company went public in October 2021. Eldridge also has a stake in the Los Angeles Dodgers; Chavez Ravine, the acreage around Dodger Stadium; Cloud9; and Fanatics, Inc..

In December 2021, it was announced that Eldridge's CEO Todd Boehly was heading an ownership group in negotiations to purchase a controlling interest in the Washington Spirit.

Technology 
Eldridge has invested in fintech companies PayActiv, Stash and Truebill. In February 2021, Stash reached a value of over $1.4 billion.

Eldridge has invested in technology companies Capital Integration Systems (CAIS), Digital Asset, and Cutover. In 2021, Eldridge participated in multiple funding rounds for digital delivery service Gopuff, including the company's $1.1 billion financing round.

In July 2020, Eldridge invested in a $53 million fundraising round for Kernel, a Los Angeles-based neurotechnology company.

Eldridge took part in a $475 million financing round for artificial intelligence company Dataminr.

The firm provided financing to Prescient, a building technology platform, for $50 million in July 2018. Eldridge committed an additional $40 million in funding for the company in June 2020 for a total of $90 million. Eldridge led a $190 million strategic investment into Prescient in 2021.

Eldridge acquired data technology company Knoema in 2020. Eldridge has invested in The Ready Games and mobile game developer Tripledot Studios. Eldridge held a stake in Epic Games which was sold back to Epic in 2021.

Eldridge has made multiple investments into Truebill, including participating in a $45 million funding round in 2021, after leading a Series B round in 2019. Truebill was acquired by Rocket companies in 2021.

Eldridge participated in a $235 million in AI security company AnyVision in July 2021, after previously investing in the company in 2018.

Eldridge invested in digital health platform Wellthy in May 2020, and participated in a $35 million Series B funding round for the company in June 2021. Eldridge also participated in a $62 million investment round for fertility services company Kindbody. Eldridge also acquired sporting goods producer G-Form, which produces Smart-Flex athletic gear.

In November 2021, Eldridge participated in a $30 million investment round for artificial intelligence company Netomi. The company also led a $600 million debt funding round for Digital Currency Group.

In January 2022, Eldridge led a $210 million investment round for Canadian financial technology company Koho. The company led investment rounds for Cross River Bank, which was valued at $3 billion in March 2022, and an investment round for insurance technology company Accelerant, which valued the company at $2.2 billion. In April 2022, Eldridge also led a $198 million investment round into digital marketing firm Viral Nation, and an $82 million investment round for e-commerce platform Samcart.

In 2022, the company has also invested in Metropolis Technologies, Cloudframe, and materials science company Recover. Eldridge led a $400 million investment round for Velocity Global, and took a seat on its board of directors.

Consumer industry 
In 2017 Eldridge acquired, with a co-investor, Pittsburg-based NPC International, LLC, the largest franchisee of Pizza Hut (part of Yum Brands), and Wendy's.  On July 1, 2020 NPC filed for Chapter 11 bankruptcy.

Eldridge has backed hospitality group Aurify Brands since it was founded in 2011. Eldridge invested in international bakery-restaurant chain Le Pain Quotidien through Aurify in March 2021. Eldridge also invested in pizza restaurant chain Chuck E. Cheese.

Thirteenth Floor Entertainment Group, an operator of horror-themed entertainment venues and escape rooms, is partially owned by Eldridge. Eldridge was part of a group of creditors who invested $1.2 billion in Canadian company Cirque du Soleil in 2020.

Eldridge invested in virtual reality entertainment company Illuminarium Experiences, as part of a $100 million investment. The company led a $3.4 million funding round for food delivery marketplace Sesame in December 2021.

Real estate 
Eldridge owns Stonebriar Commercial Finance, a large ticket commercial finance and leasing company, and co-owns Cain International, a London-headquartered real estate firm which owns The Beverly Hilton and Waldorf Astoria Beverly Hills.

Eldridge seeded Essential Properties Realty Trust, a REIT that went public in June 2018. In October 2019, Eldridge invested $300 million in real estate investment company Kennedy Wilson. Eldridge committed €1 billion to Blackbrook Capital, an independent European real estate investment firm, in March 2020.

In December 2021, Eldridge acquired a minority interest in Langdon Park Capital, a Black-owned real estate investment company." Langdon Park Capital subsequently acquired 200 housing units in Los Angeles as part of a strategy to create affordable housing for the Black and Latino communities.

Insurance 
Eldridge owns Security Benefit Life Insurance, an insurer with $49.9 billion in assets. The firm also owns SE2, a technology platform for insurance companies. In 2019 SE2 and Life.io launched an integrated life insurance and annuity platform, SE2 Digital Engage.

Eldridge invested in DPL Financial Partners in January 2021 and September 2022. That year, Eldridge invested in PPRO Financial and Clearcover Insurance. Hudson Structured Capital Management refinanced in 2021, with Eldridge as its principal backer.

Media holdings 
In 2015, Eldridge put some of its media properties up for sale, including Adweek and the Clio Awards. Adweek was sold a year later to Beringer Capital. The Clio Awards, a 58-year-old ad industry event, was sold to investment company Evolution Media in 2017.

In December 2016, Billboard-Hollywood Reporter Media Group purchased the music publications Spin, Stereogum and Vibe from SpinMedia for an undisclosed amount.

In February 2018, Eldridge announced it would be consolidating three of its entertainment properties into a new company, Valence Media, which rebranded as MRC on July 20, 2020. The properties included Media Rights Capital, a film and television studio which created Netflix shows Ozark and House of Cards; Dick Clark Productions; and the Billboard-The Hollywood Reporter Media Group.

MRC's co-founders Asif Satchu and Modi Wiczyk serve as co-CEOs and Boehly serves as Chairman. At the time, MRC owned a minority stake in film distributor A24; and London-based production company Fulwell 73.

In 2018, Eldridge also became a partner for the Global Citizen Festival, which was held in South Africa to honor the life and legacy of Nelson Mandela in his centenary year.

In December 2019, Valence acquired Nielsen Holdings' music data business.

In January 2020, MRC sold music publications Spin and Stereogum to Next Management Partners.

In November 2020, Eldridge acquired the music publishing rights to American rock band The Killers, covering the band's first five albums. Universal Music Publishing Group will continue to administer the catalogue.

In September 2020, it was announced that Penske Media Corporation and MRC would form a joint venture named PMRC. The new venture managed the daily operations of publications such as Billboard, The Hollywood Reporter, Vibe, Variety, Rolling Stone and Music Business Worldwide. A second joint venture between MRC and Penske was also announced, to manage content and intellectual property such as television series, films, and live events including Life Is Beautiful Music & Art Festival and South by Southwest. The venture became the majority owner of South by Southwest in 2021.

Eldridge led a $3 million funding round for Laylo, a startup fan engagement platform, in 2021. The company led another funding round into Laylo in 2022.

In December 2021, Eldridge partnered with Sony Music Group to finance the acquisition of Bruce Springsteen's recorded music and songwriting catalogue. The deal, which was estimated to be between $500 million and $600 million, was reportedly the largest transaction for an individual artist's music rights to date.

In August 2022, Eldridge and MRC reached an agreement to separate their assets. Eldridge became a minority stakeholder in MRC, acquired ownership of Dick Clark Productions and Billboard-Hollywood Reporter Media Group from the company, and retained its investments in ventures such as Penske Media, A24 and Luminate Data.

Boehly became interim CEO of the Hollywood Foreign Press Association (HFPA), the organizer of the Golden Globe Awards, in 2021. In July 2022, it was announced that Eldridge would acquire the HFPA, and establish a private company to manage the intellectual property of the Golden Globes. The HFPA's philanthropic activities will be spun off into a non-profit organization. The organization announced a series of planned reforms under Eldridge's ownership, including the addition of new Golden Globes voters to increase the diversity of its membership, which had previously been criticized for a lack of Black representation.

References

External links 

 

Alternative investment management companies
Holding companies of the United States
2015 establishments in Connecticut
Financial services companies established in 2015
Investment management companies of the United States
Companies based in Greenwich, Connecticut